Uspenka is a rural locality (a selo) in Volokonovsky District, Belgorod Oblast, Russia. The population was 418 as of 2010. There are 3 streets.

Geography 
Uspenka is located 24 km northeast of Volokonovka (the district's administrative centre) by road. Krasnoye Gorodishche is the nearest rural locality.

References 

Rural localities in Volokonovsky District